Sarzeh Al-e Mehtarian (also Romanized as Sarzeh Āl-e Mehtarīān; also known as Sarzeh Ālmehtarī) is a village in Shamil Rural District, Takht District, Bandar Abbas County, Hormozgan Province, Iran. At the 2006 census, its population was 487, in 100 families.

References 

Populated places in Bandar Abbas County